Ghostory is the third studio album by American indie rock band School of Seven Bells, released on February 28, 2012 by Vagrant Records and Ghostly International. It is also their first album to be released after the departure of founding member Claudia Deheza, who left the band in October 2010. The track listing details were revealed when the album was made available for streaming through several websites on February 20, 2012.

Track listing

Personnel
 Alejandra de la Deheza – vocals
 Benjamin Curtis – engineering, guitar, mixing, production
 Divya Anantharaman – headdress
 Steve Choo – assistant engineering
 Christopher Colley – drums 
 Bryan Abdul Collins – art direction, design
 Brandon Curtis – additional production, mixing
 Stella Rey – styling
 Geoff Sanoff – drum engineering
 Danny Scales – cover photo
 Daniel Duemer – additional support

Charts

References

2012 albums
Ghostly International albums
School of Seven Bells albums
Vagrant Records albums